Marcellin Gaha Djiadeu (born March 24, 1982 in Bafang) is a professional Cameroonian footballer currently playing as player-coach for Unisport de Bafang.

Career 
He began his career at FC Unisport de Bafang and signed in January 2003 with Cotonsport Garoua. Djiadeu left in December 2008 to Cotonsport FC de Garoua and signed in Indonesia for Arema FC. He returned in the Spring of 2010 to Cameroon and became the captain of Unisport de Bafang.

Coaching career 
In April 2013 he attained the B Coaching Licence and started as player-head coach of Unisport de Bafang.

Notes

1982 births
Living people
Cameroonian footballers
Cameroonian expatriates in Indonesia
Coton Sport FC de Garoua players
Expatriate footballers in Indonesia
Cameroonian football managers
Association football defenders